Chang Chun-hsiung, (born 23 March 1938) is a Taiwanese politician. He is a former Premier of the Republic of China. Chang was appointed to two separate terms as Premier, both under Chen Shui-bian. His appointment by then-President Chen in 2000 marked the first time a Democratic Progressive Party member occupied the premiership.

As a founding member of the Democratic Progressive Party (DPP), he was a member of its Central Committee and Executive Member of its Central Standing Committee from 1986 to 2000.

Early life
Chang was born in 1938 in the city of Kagi (present-day Chiayi) when Taiwan (then Formosa) was still a colony of Japan. He earned his LL.B. at the  National Taiwan University in 1960. Chang joined the Kuomintang in 1970, but was expelled three year later for mounting a campaign for the Taipei City Council. As a lawyer, he defended the victims of the Kaohsiung Incident in 1980. From 1982 to 1986 he was President of the Kaohsiung Chapter of the YMCA.

Political career
He was a member of the Legislative Yuan from 1983 to 2000. As a legislator, he was Executive Director and General Convener of the DPP Caucus from 1987 to 1988, 1990, and 1998 to 1999. He was Convener of the Judiciary Committee in 1991, of the Home and Border Affairs Committee in 92, and of the Transportation and Communications Committee in 95.

In 1994, Chang stood as the Democratic Progressive Party candidate to run for the mayor of Kaohsiung, but was defeated by the Kuomintang incumbent Wu Den-yih.

In the 2000 presidential election he was General Manager of Chen Shui-bian's campaign. In the Chen administration, he served as Secretary-General of the Office of the President in 2000, Vice Premier of the ROC in 2000 and Premier of the Republic of China from October 6, 2000 to February 1, 2002.

Since 2002, he has been Secretary General of the Democratic Progressive Party and a Senior Adviser in the Office of the President.

He ran in the 2004 Legislative Yuan election as fourth on the DPP's nationwide slate and was easily elected but resigned (as he promised to do during the campaign) since the Pan-Green Coalition failed to win a majority. He also tendered his resignation as Secretary-General of the Democratic Progressive Party to take responsibility for the defeat.

Chang was appointed as the chairman of the Straits Exchange Foundation in 2005 after the death of the former chairman Koo Chen-fu. With the resignation of Su Tseng-chang as Premier on May 12, 2007, President Chen Shui-bian nominated Chang to fill the post of Premier a second time effective May 21, and Hung Chi-chang succeeded Chang as the chairman of the Straits Exchange Foundation.  Su's resignation and Chang's second appointment as Premier marked the sixth premier that Chen Shui-bian has appointed during his two terms as President.

Family life
Chang maintained a long-term marriage-like relationship with a paramour while remaining legally married to his first wife, Hsu Jui-ying. After his first term as Premier, he and Hsu divorced, and in 2007 he married his paramour (Chu A-ying) as his second wife.

References

1938 births
Living people
Members of the 1st Legislative Yuan in Taiwan
Democratic Progressive Party Members of the Legislative Yuan
National Taiwan University alumni
Premiers of the Republic of China on Taiwan
Taiwan independence activists
Taiwanese democracy activists
Taiwanese people of Hoklo descent
Politicians of the Republic of China on Taiwan from Chiayi County
Kaohsiung Members of the Legislative Yuan
Members of the 2nd Legislative Yuan
Members of the 3rd Legislative Yuan
Members of the 4th Legislative Yuan
Party List Members of the Legislative Yuan
Senior Advisors to President Chen Shui-bian
Recipients of the Order of Chiang Chung-Cheng